"Baby Mama" is a song by American singer Fantasia from her debut studio album, Free Yourself (2004). It was written by Vito Colapietro, Neely Dinkins, Harold Lilly, and produced by Lilly and duo Colapietro and Dinkins under their production moniker The Co-Stars. The song samples from "There Will Never Be Any Peace (Until God Is Seated at the Conference Table)" by American vocal quartet The Chi-Lites. Due to the inclusion of the sample, Eugene Record and Barbara Acklin are also credited as songwriters. The song was released on May 3, 2005, as the third single from the album. "Baby Mama" was a moderate commercial success in the United States, peaking at number sixteen on the Hot R&B/Hip-Hop Songs and number sixty on the Billboard Hot 100.

Critical reception
The song is very meaningful to Fantasia because it was written as an anthem to inspire single mothers across the United States to follow their dreams. Fantasia has stated that "Baby Mama" is dedicated to "all of those single moms out there who tough it out to take care of the kids and work two jobs, go to school". Critics have accused the song sending the wrong message about sexual activity and pregnancy to teens. The song takes its title from the slang term baby mama. A parody of the song was made by comedian Rickey Smiley.

Track listing

Sample credits
"Baby Mama" contains a sample of "There'll Never Be Any Peace (Until God Is Seated at the Conference Table)" by the Chi-Lites.

Credits and personnel 
Credits adapted from the liner notes of Free Yourself.

Kamel Abdo – mixing, recording
Barbara Acklin – writer
Vito Colapietro – producer, writer
Neely Dinkins – producer, writer
Allison Lilly – background vocalist
Harold Lilly – producer, writer
Eugene Record – writer

Charts

Weekly charts

Year-end charts

References

External links
Pitchfork: "Baby Mama" review

2005 singles
Fantasia Barrino songs
Songs written by Barbara Acklin
Songs written by Eugene Record
Songs written by Harold Lilly (songwriter)
J Records singles
2005 songs